Kondoor  is a village in Kottayam district in the state of Kerala, India.

Kondoor village is located near to Erattupetta. There is a national library, and some shops in the village.

Demographics
 India census, Kondoor had a population of 19647 with 9853 males and 9794 females.

References

Villages in Kottayam district